With Respect to Nat is a 1965 studio album by jazz pianist Oscar Peterson, recorded in tribute to Nat King Cole, who had died earlier that year. Peterson sings on all tracks except "Easy Listening Blues".

With Respect to Nat is the second album to feature Peterson singing, following Romance: The Vocal Styling Of Oscar Peterson, from 1954. A third, The Personal Touch was released in 1980.

Reception

Writing for AllMusic, critic Scott Yanow wrote "Peterson, who rarely ever sang, is very effective on the well-rounded program, whether being backed by a big band (arranged by Manny Albam) on half of the selections or re-creating both the spirit of the Nat King Cole Trio and his own group of the late '50s during a reunion with guitarist Herb Ellis and bassist Ray Brown."

Track listing
"When My Sugar Walks Down the Street" (Gene Austin, Jimmy McHugh, Irving Mills) – 2:18
"It's Only a Paper Moon" (Harold Arlen, Yip Harburg, Billy Rose) – 2:29
"Walkin' My Baby Back Home" (Fred E. Ahlert, Roy Turk) – 2:31
"Sweet Lorraine" (Cliff Burwell, Mitchell Parish) – 3:31
"Unforgettable" (Irving Gordon) – 2:37
"Little Girl" (Francis Henry, Matt Hyde) – 2:35
"Gee, Baby, Ain't I Good to You" (Andy Razaf, Don Redman) – 2:56
"Orange Colored Sky" (Milton DeLugg, William Stein) – 2:12
"Straighten Up and Fly Right" (Nat King Cole, Irving Mills) – 2:25
"Calypso Blues" (Clifford Carmen, Cole, Don George) – 3:34
"What Can I Say After I Say I'm Sorry?" (Walter Donaldson, Abe Lyman) – 2:39
"Easy Listening Blues" (Nadine Robinson) – 3:23

Personnel
Oscar Peterson — piano, vocals
Hank Jones — piano
Ray Brown, Richard Davis — double bass
Herb Ellis, Barry Galbraith — guitar
Mel Lewis — drums
Wayne Andre, Jimmy Cleveland, J. J. Johnson — trombone
Tony Studd — bass trombone
Seldon Powell — alto flute, tenor saxophone
Jerome Richardson — bass flute, tenor saxophone
John Frosk, Joe Newman — trumpet
Ernie Royal, Danny Stiles — trumpet, flugelhorn
Phil Woods — alto saxophone
Manny Albam — arranger, conductor

References

1965 albums
Oscar Peterson albums
Nat King Cole tribute albums
Vocal jazz albums
Limelight Records albums
Verve Records albums
Albums arranged by Manny Albam
Albums conducted by Manny Albam